Tachlovice is a municipality and village in Prague-West District in the Central Bohemian Region of the Czech Republic. It has about 900 inhabitants.

Geography
It lies on the Radotínský creek, in a flat agricultural landscape of the Prague Plateau.

Sights

The Baroque complex of the Church of Saint James the Great is a cultural monument. It represents an architecturally and urbanistically valuable set of buildings from the 1740s with clear remnants of the original Gothic construction. It contains the church and a cemetery chapel.

Culture
Veteran Car Club Tachlovice was founded in 1960. Since 1976, it organizes a veteran cars exhibition and contest called Tachlovice Triangle. It is held once a year in memory of the founder Jan Horák. Vehicles manufactured until the 1970s are displayed near the village common and some of them later compete driving on the triangle route.

Gallery

References

External links

 
Tachlovice Triangle 

Villages in Prague-West District